The Hogarth Roundabout sees the merger of two of the nine direct feeders to the main radial roads to or from London. Namely the A316 Great Chertsey Road and the A4 Great West Road in Chiswick. In addition Dorchester Grove, becoming Chiswick Lane, branches off to the north and Church Lane to the conserved, affluent, Old Chiswick nucleus to the south. It contains trees and is much-lined with greenery yet is at surface level, save for a one-way flyover for much of the lighter eastbound traffic.

Roundabout 

The roundabout is named after the eighteenth-century painter William Hogarth whose home is behind a long, high wall west of the junction: Hogarth's House. The eastern approach abuts the Griffin Brewery of Fuller, Smith and Turner where beer has been brewed since 1654. The south side has the 18th-century George and Devonshire pub. Another pub by the roundabout, the Mawsons Arms on Chiswick Lane, was sold along with the brewery to Asahi in 2019.

The junction is important for road transport as it is the only non-circuitous route to Heathrow Airport from the City and the West End. On 29 October 2013, after the previous day's stormy winds, Transport for London inspectors discovered 'defects' and closed the flyover, declaring it "unsafe". Garrett Emmerson stated its engineers identified a degradation in the concrete deck of the flyover. Traffic thus concentrated with queues in day-time back to the Hammersmith flyover and many more miles, at morning peak, to the west.

Flyover 

The junction is noteworthy for the single-lane flyover to ease some eastbound traffic from the A316 onto the A4. It was built as a temporary measure in 1971, using the Bridgway format devised and offered to highway authorities by Marples Ridgeway Ltd.

The flyover was quickly put together with a cheap steel frame and was designed to last no more than a few years.  The central span has pairs of diagonal cross-braces to give the structure strength and help protect it against strong winds. The junction would have been in the plans for London Ringways – shelved in the latter years of the 20th century. These would have a more durable structure put in place.  In the early 2010s a major refurbishment: a new deck, surface and parapets has ensured its survival and confirmed its stature as a permanent fixture. The work opened in September 2014, at a total cost of £3 million.

References

Citations

Footnotes

External links
 To Gin Lane Via Hogarth's Roundabout
 SABRE road lists         
 CBRD Photo Gallery

Road junctions in London
Transport in the London Borough of Hounslow
Roundabouts in England
Chiswick